Ophthalmosauridae is an extinct family of thunnosaur ichthyosaurs from the Middle Jurassic to the early Late Cretaceous (Bajocian - Cenomanian) worldwide. Almost all ichthyosaurs from the Middle Jurassic onwards belong to the family, until the extinction of ichthyosaurs in the early Late Cretaceous. Opthalmosaurids appeared worldwide during early Bajocian, subsequent to the disappearance of most other ichthyosaur lineages after the end of the Toarcian. Currently, the oldest known ophthalmosaurids is Mollesaurus from the early Bajocian of Argentina, as well as indeterminate remains of the same age from Luxembourg and Canada. Named by George H. Baur, in 1887, the family contains the basal taxa like Ophthalmosaurus. Appleby (1956) named the taxon Ophthalmosauria which was followed by some authors, but these two names are often treated as synonyms; Ophthalmosauridae has the priority over Ophthalmosauria. However, some researchers argue that Ophthalmosauridae should be restricted to the group typically referred to as Ophthalmosaurinae, with classic Platypterygiinae instead being referred to as Undorosauridae or Brachypterygiidae and  Ophthalmosauria being used to unite these two groups.

Phylogeny 

Ophthalmosauridae is a node-based taxon defined by Ryosuke Motani (1999) as "the last common ancestor of Brachypterygius extremus and Ophthalmosaurus icenicus and all of its descendants". The definition he proposed for Ophthalmosauria was exactly the same. In this case both definitions are synonyms. The cladogram below follows the topology from a 2010 analysis by Patrick S. Druckenmiller and Erin E. Maxwell.

Valentin Fischer, Edwige Masure, Maxim S. Arkhangelsky and Pascal Godefroit (2011) described a new genus of Ophthalmosauridae. They redefined it as "the last common ancestor of Arthropterygius chrisorum and Ophthalmosaurus icenicus and all of its descendants". In this case Ophthalmosauria isn't a junior synonym of Ophthalmosauridae. The cladogram below follows Fischer et al. 2011.

*Note: Placement of Ophthalmosauria by definition.

Fischer et al. (2012) described another new genus of Ophthalmosauridae. They defined for the first time two subfamilies within the Ophthalmosauridae, Ophthalmosaurinae and Platypterygiinae. Ophthalmosaurus and Platypterygius were found to be non-monophyletic. Ophthalmosauridae was characterized by a reduced extracondylar area, a plate-like dorsal trochanter, a humerus with a facet for an anterior accessory element and the absence of notching on the paddle elements of the forefin. The cladogram below follows Fischer et al. 2012.

Since 2019 
In 2019, two species of Cryopterygius were assigned to the genus Undorosaurus by Zverkov & Efimov (2019). The authors considered the type species of the former genus, C. kristiansenae, to be synonymous with Undorosaurus gorodischensis; second species of Cryopterygius, C. kielanae, was tentatively maintained by the authors as a distinct species within the genus Undorosaurus.

The following cladogram shows a possible phylogenetic positions within Ophthalmosauridae according to the analysis performed by Zverkov and Jacobs (2020).

References

 
Middle Jurassic ichthyosaurs
Late Jurassic ichthyosaurs
Early Cretaceous ichthyosaurs
Aalenian first appearances
Turonian extinctions
Ichthyosaurs
Prehistoric reptile families